HMS Crane was a Palmer three-funnel, 30-knot destroyer ordered by the Royal Navy under the 1895–1896 Naval Estimates. She was the sixth ship to carry this name since it was introduced in 1590 for a 24-gun schooner in service until 1629.

Construction
She was laid down on 2 August 1896 at the Palmer shipyard at Jarrow-on-Tyne and launched on 17 December 1896.  During her builder's trials Crane made her contracted speed requirement. She was completed and accepted by the Royal Navy in April 1898.

Service history

Pre-War
After commissioning Crane was assigned to the Devonport Flotilla. In early January 1901 she was posted to the Portsmouth instructional flotilla, under the command of Commander Michael Henry Hodges. On 2 September 1902 Lieutenant Arthur Kenneth Macrorie was appointed in command, when she commissioned at Portsmouth for service on the Mediterranean Station. She arrived at Malta later the same month. Returning to Home Waters in 1904, she was assigned to the East Coast Flotilla.

On 10 March 1910 Crane was moored to a buoy in Portsmouth harbour when she was rammed by the cross-Channel ferry Princess Margaret. Cranes bows were badly damaged in the collision.

On 30 August 1912 the Admiralty directed all destroyer classes were to be designated by alpha characters starting with the letter 'A'. After 30 September 1913, she was known as a C-class destroyer and had the letter ‘C’ painted on the hull below the bridge area and on either the fore or aft funnel.

World War I
In September 1914 the 7th was redeployed to the Humber River. She remained in this deployment until the cessation of hostilities. Her employment within the Humber Patrol included anti-submarine and counter-mining patrols.

On 28 October 1914 under the command of Commander R. H. Coppinger, she took part in operations off the Belgian Coast.

Disposal
In 1919 she was paid off and laid-up in reserve awaiting disposal.  She was sold on 10 June 1919 to Thos. W. Ward of Sheffield for breaking at New Holland, Lincolnshire, on the Humber Estuary.

She was awarded the battle honour "Belgian Coast 1914 - 1917".

Pennant numbers

References
Note:  All tabular data under General Characteristics only from the listed Jane's Fighting Ships volume unless otherwise specified

Bibliography
 
 
 
 
 
 
 
 

 

Ships built on the River Tyne
1896 ships
C-class destroyers (1913)
World War I destroyers of the United Kingdom